Florence Delorez Griffith Joyner (born Florence Delorez Griffith; December 21, 1959 – September 21, 1998), also known as Flo-Jo, was an American track and field athlete. She set world records in 1988 for the 100 m and 200 m. During the late 1980s she became a popular figure due to both her record-setting athleticism and eclectic personal style.

Griffith Joyner was born and raised in California. She was athletic from a young age and began running at track meets as a child. While attending California State University, Northridge (CSUN) and University of California, Los Angeles (UCLA), she continued to compete in track and field. While still in college, she qualified for the 100 m 1980 Olympics, although she did not actually compete due to the U.S. boycott. She made her Olympic debut four years later, winning a silver medal in the 200 meter distance at the 1984 Olympics held in Los Angeles. At the 1988 U.S. Olympic trials, Griffith set a new world record in the 100 meter sprint. She went on to win three gold medals at the 1988 Olympics.

In February 1989, Griffith Joyner abruptly retired from athletics. She remained a pop culture figure through endorsement deals, acting, and designing. She died in her sleep as the result of an epileptic seizure in 1998 at the age of 38. She is buried at the El Toro Memorial Park in Lake Forest.

Early life
Griffith was born in Los Angeles, California, the seventh of eleven children born to Robert, an electrician, and Florence Griffith, a seamstress. The family lived in Littlerock, California, before Florence Griffith moved with her children to the Jordan Downs public housing complex located in the Watts section of Los Angeles.

When Griffith was in elementary school, she joined the Sugar Ray Robinson Organization, running in track meets on weekends. She won the Jesse Owens National Youth Games two years in a row, at the ages of 14 and 15. Griffith ran track at Jordan High School in Los Angeles.

Showing an early interest in fashion, Griffith persuaded the members of the track team to wear tights with their uniforms. As a high school senior in 1978, she finished sixth at the CIF California State Meet behind future teammates Alice Brown and Pam Marshall. By the time she graduated from Jordan High School in 1978, she had set high-school records in sprinting and long jump.

Career
Griffith attended the California State University at Northridge, and was on the track team coached by Bob Kersee. This team, which included Brown and Jeanette Bolden, won the national championship during Griffith's first year of college. However, Griffith had to drop out to support her family, taking a job as a bank teller. Kersee found financial aid for her and she returned to college in 1980, this time at University of California at Los Angeles (UCLA) where Kersee was working as a coach.

Brown, Bolden, and Griffith qualified for the 100-meter final at the trials for the 1980 Summer Olympics (with Brown winning and Griffith finishing last in the final). Griffith also ran the 200 meters, narrowly finishing fourth, a foot out of a qualifying position. However, the U.S. Government had already decided to boycott those Olympic Games mooting those results. In 1983, Griffith graduated from UCLA with her bachelor's degree in psychology.

Olympic runner
Griffith finished fourth in the 200-meter sprint at the first World Championship in Athletics in 1983. In the next year, she qualified for the Olympics in the 200-meter distance with the second fastest time at the United States Olympic Trials, held in Los Angeles. Evelyn Ashford, another UCLA alumna and early favorite to medal, dropped out of the 200-meter due to injury. Griffith went on to win a silver medal in the 1984 Summer Olympics.

After the 1984 Olympic Games, she spent less time running. Griffith continued to run part-time, winning the 100-meter IAAF Grand Prix Final with the time of 11.00 seconds. She did not compete at the 1985 U.S. National Championship. That same year, she returned to working at a bank and styled hair and nails in her spare time. She married Al Joyner, the Olympic triple jump champion of 1984, in 1987.

She returned to athletics in April 1987. Four months later, at the 1987 World Championships in Rome, Griffith Joyner finished second in the 200-meter sprint. Her success during the 1987 season resulted in being ranked second in Track and Field News' 1987 world rankings. The 200 meters remained a stronger event for her than the 100 meters, where she was ranked seventh in the United States.

Before the 1988 U.S. Olympic Trials, Griffith Joyner continued to work with her coach, and now husband's brother-in-law, Kersee, two days a week, but with her new husband coaching her three days a week. She ran the 100 meter in 10.96-seconds at the 1987 Cologne Grand Prix Track and Field Meet, a personal best but the mark was not even in the top 40 of all time. She continued to improve, again setting a personal best of 10.89 in the 100 meters in San Diego on June 25, 1988, but still remained shy of then American record holder Evelyn Ashford's three best times. A week before the trials she ran a tune-up race in 10.99 in Santa Monica.

In the first race of the quarterfinals of the U.S. Olympic Trials, she stunned her colleagues when she sprinted 100 meters in 10.49 seconds, a new world record by a margin of 0.27s over the previous record held by Evelyn Ashford. Over the two-day trials, Griffith Joyner recorded the three fastest times for a woman at 100 meters: 10.49 in the quarter-final, 10.70 in the semifinal, and 10.61 in the final. At the same Olympic trials, she also set an American record at the 200-meter distance with a time of 21.77 seconds.

The 100-meter record was by far the largest improvement in the world record time since the advent of electronic timing, and still stands. This extraordinary result raised the possibility of a technical malfunction with the wind gauge which read at 0.0 m/s - a reading at odds with the windy conditions on the day, with high wind speeds being recorded in all other sprints before and after this race as well as the parallel long jump runway at the time of the Griffith Joyner performance. All scientific studies commissioned by the IAAF and independent organisations have since found there was an illegal tailwind of between 5 m/s – 7 m/s at the time. The IAAF has not annulled the result, but since 1997 the International Athletics Annual of the Association of Track and Field Statisticians has listed it as "probably strongly wind assisted, but recognized as a world record." The fastest non-wind-assisted performance would then be Griffith Joyner's 10.61s in the final the next day. This mark was equaled by Elaine Thompson-Herah in the 2020 Olympic Final before being surpassed by Thompson-Herah at the post-Olympics Eugene Diamond League meeting in August 2021. Thompson-Herah clocked 10.54 seconds, officially the second fastest time in women's 100 m history.

Following the Olympic trials, in late July 1988, Griffith Joyner left coach Kersee saying she wanted a coach able to provide more personal attention. Another contributing factor was her unhappiness with the lack of sponsorship and endorsement opportunities. In addition to being her coach, Kersee was Griffith Joyner's manager, as he required all the athletes he coached to use his management services too. Griffith Joyner's decision to sign with personal manager Gordon Baskin therefore necessitated the coaching change. She left UCLA for UC Irvine with her husband serving as full-time coach.

By now known to the world as "Flo-Jo", Griffith Joyner was the big favorite for the titles in the sprint events at the 1988 Summer Olympics. In the 100-meter final, she ran a 10.54, beating her nearest rival to the world record, Evelyn Ashford, by 0.30 seconds. In the 200 meter semifinal, she set the world record of 21.56 seconds and then broke this record by 0.22 seconds in winning the final with a time of 21.34 seconds. Like her 100-meter world record, this mark still stands.

At the same Olympics, Griffith Joyner also ran with the 4 × 100 m relay and the 4 × 400 m relay teams. Her team won the 4 × 100 m relay and finished second in the 4 × 400 m relay. This was her first internationally rated 4 × 400 m relay. She left the games having won four Olympic medals, three gold and one silver. At the time, her medal haul was the second most for female track and field athlete in history, behind only Fanny Blankers-Koen who won four gold medals in 1948.

In February 1989, Griffith Joyner announced her retirement from racing. She cited her new business opportunities outside of sprinting. The month after announcing her retirement, she was selected as the winner of the James E. Sullivan Award of 1988 as the top amateur athlete in the United States.

Comeback attempt and other activities
Griffith Joyner's success at the 1988 Olympics led to new opportunities. In the weeks following the Olympics, she earned millions of dollars from endorsement deals, primarily in Japan. She also signed a deal with toy maker LJN Toys for a Barbie-like doll in her likeness.

Among the things she did away from the track was to design the basketball uniforms for the Indiana Pacers NBA team in 1989. She served as co-chair of President's Council on Physical Fitness. She made a guest appearance as herself on a season 4 episode of 227, and appeared in the soap opera Santa Barbara in 1992, as "Terry Holloway", a photographer similar to Annie Leibovitz.

In 1996, Griffith Joyner appeared on Charlie Rose and announced her comeback to competitive athletics, concentrating on the 400-meter run. Her reason was that she had already set world marks in both the 100 m and 200 m events, with the 400 m world record being her goal. She trained steadily leading up to the U.S. Olympic trials in June. However, tendonitis in her right leg ended her hopes of becoming a triple-world-record holder. Al Joyner also attempted a comeback, but he was unable to compete due to an injured quadriceps muscle.

Style
Beyond her running prowess, Griffith Joyner was known for her bold fashion choices. She appeared at the World Championships in 1987 in Rome wearing a hooded speed skating body suit. In April 1988 she started wearing a running suit with the right leg of the suit extending to the ankle and the left leg of the suit cut off, a style she called the "one-legger". The running suits also had bold colors such as lime green or purple with white bikini bottoms and embellished with lightning bolts.

Her nails also garnered attention for their length and designs. Her nails were four inches long with tiger stripes at the 1988 Olympic trials before switching to fuchsia. For the Olympic games themselves, she had six inch nails painted red, white, blue, and gold. Although many sprinters avoided accessories which might slow them down, Griffith Joyner kept her hair long and wore jewelry while competing. She designed many of her outfits herself and preferred looks which were not conventional.

Allegations of performance-enhancing drug use

After her record-shattering performances at the 1988 U.S. Olympic Trials, she became an object of suspicion when she arrived at the 1988 Olympic Games in Seoul. Athletes, including Joaquim Cruz and Ben Johnson, expressed disbelief over Griffith Joyner's dramatic improvement over a short period of time. Before the 1988 track and field season, her best time in the 100-meter sprint was 10.96 seconds (set in 1987). In 1988, she improved that by 0.47 seconds.

Her best before 1988 at 200 meters was 21.96 seconds (also set in 1987). In 1988, she improved that by 0.62 seconds to 21.34 seconds, another time that has not been approached. Griffith Joyner attributed the change in her physique to new health programs. Al Joyner replaced Bob Kersee as her coach, and he changed her training program to include more lower body strength training exercises such as squats and lunges.

In a 1989 story for which he was purportedly paid $25,000, Darrell Robinson, a former teammate of Griffith Joyner, claimed that he sold her 10 mL of growth hormone for $2,000 in 1988. He said Joyner told him: "if you want to make $1 million, you've got to invest some thousands." Robinson claimed to have received steroids from coach Bob Kersee and said he saw Carl Lewis inject himself with drugs he believed to be testosterone.

Robinson never provided any evidence for his allegations and was shunned by the athletics community, leading to the premature end of his career. After the 1988 Olympics, Griffith Joyner retired from competitive track and field, just before the introduction of mandatory random drug testing in 1989. She was repeatedly tested during competition and passed every test.

After her death in 1998, Prince Alexandre de Merode, chairman of the International Olympic Committee's medical commission, claimed that Griffith Joyner was singled out for extra, rigorous drug testing during the 1988 Olympic Games following rumors of steroid use. De Merode told The New York Times that Manfred Donike, who was at that time considered to be the foremost expert on drugs and sports, failed to discover any banned substances during that testing. The World Anti-Doping Agency was created in the 1990s, removing control of drug testing from the IOC and De Merode. De Merode later stated: "We performed all possible and imaginable analyses on her. We never found anything. There should not be the slightest suspicion."

Personal life
Griffith's nickname among family was "Dee Dee". She was briefly engaged to hurdler Greg Foster. In 1987, Griffith married 1984 Olympic triple jump champion Al Joyner, whom Griffith had first met at the 1980 Olympic Trials. Through her marriage to Joyner she was sister-in-law to track and field athlete Jackie Joyner-Kersee. Griffith and Joyner had one daughter together, Mary Ruth Joyner, born November 15, 1990.

Death
On September 21, 1998, Griffith Joyner died in her sleep at home in the Canyon Crest neighborhood of Mission Viejo, California, at the age of 38. The unexpected death was investigated by the Orange County Sheriff-Coroner's office, which announced on September 22 that the cause of death was suffocation during a severe epileptic seizure.

Griffith Joyner was found to have had a cavernous hemangioma, a congenital vascular brain abnormality that made her subject to seizures. According to a family attorney, she had suffered a tonic-clonic seizure in 1990 and had been treated for seizures in 1993 and 1994. According to the Sheriff-Coroner's office, the only drugs in her system when she died were small amounts of two common over-the-counter drugs, acetaminophen and the antihistamine Benadryl.

Legacy
USA Track & Field inducted her into its Hall of Fame in 1995. In 2000, the 102nd Street School in Los Angeles was renamed Florence Griffith Joyner Elementary School. Griffith Joyner had attended the school as a child. The city of Mission Viejo dedicated a park at the entrance to her neighborhood in her honor. Griffith Joyner was also an artist and painter. Her work has been on display as part the Art of The Olympians (AOTO). She is one of two posthumous members of AOTO, the other being the founder and Olympian, Al Oerter.  In Time 2020 list of the most influential women of the past century, she was named woman of the year for 1988.

Statistics
To date, her 1988 200 m world and Olympic record (21.34) as well as her 100 m world record (10.49) still stand, making them the longest-reigning sprinting records in track and field history. Her 100 m Olympic record (10.62) was improved in 2021 at the 2020 Summer Olympics in Tokyo by Elaine Thompson-Herah (10.61).

Olympic Games and trials results
Source:

International competitions

Season's bests

See also
 History of African Americans in Los Angeles

Notes

References

External links

 Official website (archive)
 Iconic Sports Moments- Florence Griffith 
 
 
 
 
 
 
 Florence Griffith Joyner at AOTO
 
 Videos:
 
 
 

American female sprinters
1959 births
1998 deaths
African-American female track and field athletes
Track and field athletes from Los Angeles
Athletes (track and field) at the 1984 Summer Olympics
Athletes (track and field) at the 1988 Summer Olympics
Olympic gold medalists for the United States in track and field
Olympic silver medalists for the United States in track and field
World Athletics Championships medalists
World Athletics record holders
California State University, Northridge alumni
James E. Sullivan Award recipients
UCLA Bruins women's track and field athletes
Burials in Orange County, California
Deaths from epilepsy
Deaths from asphyxiation
Neurological disease deaths in California
People from Watts, Los Angeles
Medalists at the 1988 Summer Olympics
Medalists at the 1984 Summer Olympics
Track & Field News Athlete of the Year winners
IAAF World Athlete of the Year
World Athletics Championships winners
20th-century African-American women
20th-century African-American people
20th-century African-American sportspeople
20th-century American people
Olympic female sprinters